Lena Prima is an American singer and songwriter. She is the daughter of singer, trumpeter and recording star Louis Prima and his fifth wife, Gia Maione.

Early life 
Born in Las Vegas, her childhood was divided between that city and the New Orleans/Covington area of Louisiana. She often traveled with her father on his road trips and frequently performed with him on stage. Remembering her father, Lena said, “He was like a magical creature, bigger than life, with so much charisma. He always had a twinkle in his eye, smiling, laughing and joyful.”  Lena enrolled in college at 18, but soon dropped out to be a professional entertainer, like her father.

Career 
Lena's singing career began with rock bands, despite her mother's objection to her pursuing a music career. While working a series of day jobs, Lena sang with many bands, sometimes sneaking in the back door because she was underage. Lena formed a band, Rough Angel, which recorded an album with producer Geoff Workman (The Cars, Queen, Journey, Mötley Crüe). The group eventually stalled and, when grunge took over the rock scene, Lena left rock music and found she could earn a living singing with lounge and cover bands.
 
While performing with Spiral Starecase on a cruise, Lena, at the urging of some musician friends, put a tribute show together to honor her father. The tribute evolved and grew into the show she performs today.
 
In 2005, Hurricane Katrina and the damage it made to her father's hometown made an impact on Lena. She brought her band to New Orleans to perform a benefit concert hurricane and flood relief. The visit, coupled with Lena's appearance at the New Orleans Jazz and Heritage Festival in 2010, inspired her to move with her husband to New Orleans in 2011. She continues to call the Crescent City home.

In 2018, Lena concluded a seven-year residency at the Hotel Monteleone in the French Quarter. In New Orleans, she has performed at the New Orleans Jazz & Heritage Festival, and French Quarter Festival.

Recording 
Lena has recorded six albums. Her recordings include 2010's Since the Storm, a collection of swing, jazz, ballads and originals. Pennies From Heaven (2012) is a live album recorded at the Gold Coast Showroom in Las Vegas. Starting Something, released in 2015, is an autobiographical project recorded after Lena's move to New Orleans. It features local musicians and singers and many original songs.
In 2018, Lena signed with Basin Street Records. In early 2019, the label released Prima la Famiglia, which appeared on the Billboard Jazz Albums chart.

Discography 

Reminiscing 2001 
Since the Storm 2010 (11th Hour Records) 
Pennies From Heaven 2012 
Starting Something 2014 (Aftergroove) 
Christmastime is Here 2014 
Live at the Dew Drop Jazz and Social Hall 2016 
Prima La Famiglia 2019 (Basin Street Records)

References

External links

1963 births
American jazz singers
Living people